Charaxes lycurgus, the Laodice untailed charaxes, is a butterfly in the family Nymphalidae. It is found in Guinea, Sierra Leone, Liberia, Ivory Coast, Ghana, Togo, Nigeria, Cameroon, Equatorial Guinea, Gabon, the Republic of the Congo, the Central African Republic, Angola, the Democratic Republic of the Congo, Sudan, Uganda and Tanzania. The habitat consists of lowland evergreen forests and riverine forests.

The larvae feed on Pterocarpus santalinoides, Paullinia pinnata, Albizia zygia, Lonchocarpus cyanescens, Dalbergia, Millettia, Dichapetalum and Trachyphrynium species.

Subspecies
 Charaxes lycurgus lycurgus (Guinea, Sierra Leone, Liberia, Ivory Coast, Ghana, Togo, western Nigeria)
 Charaxes lycurgus bernardiana Plantrou, 1978 (northern and eastern Nigeria, Cameroon, Gabon, Bioko, Congo, Central African Republic, northern Angola, Democratic Republic of the Congo, southern Sudan, western Uganda, Tanzania: eastern shores of Lake Tanganyika)

Taxonomy
Differs from Charaxes zelica in the deeply concave margin of the forewing, the hindwing blue spots are closer to the margin and the presence of submarginal blue spots on the forewing 

Charaxes lycurgus  is a member of the species group Charaxes lycurgus. 
The supposed clade members are:

Clade 1 
Charaxes lycurgus nominate
Charaxes porthos 
Charaxes zelica

Clade 2
Charaxes mycerina 
Charaxes doubledayi

References

Victor Gurney Logan Van Someren, 1974 Revisional notes on African Charaxes (Lepidoptera: Nymphalidae). Part IX. Bulletin of the British Museum of Natural History (Entomology) 29 (8):415-487.  as laodice

External links
Images of C. lycurgus lycurgus Royal Museum for Central Africa (Albertine Rift Project)
Charaxes lycurgus images at Consortium for the Barcode of Life
Charaxes lycurgus lycurgus images at BOLD
Charaxes lycurgus bernardiana images at BOLD

Butterflies described in 1793
lycurgus